Louisiana Christian University (LCU) is a private Baptist  university in Pineville, Louisiana. It enrolls 1,100 to 1,200 students. It is affiliated with the Louisiana Baptist Convention (Southern Baptist Convention).

Louisiana Christian University was founded in 1906 as Louisiana College. It took its current name on November 16, 2021. The school colors are orange and blue and the athletic teams are known as the Louisiana Christian Wildcats and Lady Wildcats.

History

Early history
Louisiana Christian University was founded as Louisiana College on October 3, 1906, in Pineville, across the Red River from the larger city of Alexandria. The college began in tents with four professors and nineteen students. Since 2006, LCU has reported an enrollment growth of 50 percent.

Baptist clergyman and educator Edwin O. Ware, Sr., is considered to have been the principal founder of the institution. From 1906 to 1907 Ware was the college financial agent, and its first president from 1908 to 1909. LCU is the successor to two earlier Louisiana Baptist schools, Mount Lebanon College, sometimes called Mount Lebanon University, and Keatchie Female College. The first, a men's school founded in 1852 by the North Louisiana Baptist Convention, was located in the community of Mount Lebanon in Bienville Parish. The women's college, founded in 1857 by the Grand Cane Association of Baptist Churches, was located in the community of Keatchie in De Soto Parish south of Shreveport.

After a history beset with financial difficulties, both schools came under the control of the Louisiana Baptist Convention in 1899. An Education Commission was selected by the state convention to administer the schools, with the understanding that both would be succeeded by a more centrally located institution as soon as a suitable campus could be selected. When Louisiana College was opened in 1906, Mount Lebanon College closed, followed by Keatchie a few years later. Since the first class of nineteen students in 1906, more than ten thousand students have graduated from the institution.

Until 1921, Louisiana College was administered by the Education Commission. The new charter established a board of trustees. The first administrative head of Louisiana College was W. F. Taylor, whose title was chairman of the faculty. Since its opening under President Edwin Ware, LC has had nine presidents:

 W. C. Friley, 1909–1910, also the first president of Hardin–Simmons University in Abilene, Texas
 Claybrook Cottingham, 1910-1942
 Edgar Godbold, 1942-1951
 G. Earl Guinn, 1951-1975
 Robert L. Lynn, 1975-1997
 Rory Lee, 1997-2005
 Joe W. Aguillard, 2005-2014
 Argile Smith, 2014-2015 (interim)
 Rick Brewer, 2015–Present

Since 2000
In 2012, the Louisiana Baptist Convention granted approval to Louisiana College to seek $12 million in donations from member churches within the state as part of the institution's $50 million capital improvements program. The $12 million had been intended to be used for improvements to on-campus housing. Although the campaign has since been abandoned, many residence halls were renovated shortly after the inauguration of Rick Brewer as a part of his "Campus Beautification" campaign. LC ended its fiscal year on July 31, 2012, with a $1.3 million deficit; the institution spent $30.5 million during that time but collected only $29.2 million in revenues.

In December 2013, the Southern Association of Colleges and Schools (SACS) reaffirmed LC's regional accreditation after two years of warning status. Less than three months later, SACS announced that it would investigate after LC officials were accused of having submitted documents that contain forged signatures and other inconsistencies in its official reports to the agency. Three months later, SACS placed the university on probation because of an "'integrity issue,' as well as its failure to comply with the accreditor's standards regarding 'external influence,' personnel appointments, administrative staff evaluations, control of finances, and its administration of federal student aid funds."

Some students called for a strike against Aguillard on March 24, 2014, at LC's Guinn Auditorium. Three days later, LC trustees asked Aguillard to resign and the following day ten LC trustees released a public letter critical of his leadership.

On April 15, 2014, the trustees removed Aguillard as president and named Argile Smith, the associate dean of Christian ministry of the Caskey School of Divinity, as the interim leader, and began the search for a permanent successor.

The college was granted an exception to Title IX in 2015 which allows it to legally discriminate against LGBT students for religious reasons.

In 2020, the college was admitted into the National Association of Intercollegiate Athletics, giving student athletes greater opportunity for positive national coverage.

On September 24, 2020, President Rick Brewer announced that the college would be undergoing an organizational restructuring. Part of this restructuring included naming a Provost, a first for the historic institution. Dr. Cheryl Clark, who had previously served as Vice President of Academic Affairs, was named provost.

At the start of the fall semester in 2021, the college welcomed its largest freshman class ever, with 350 students showing up for the opening day of Wildcat Welcome Weekend: the largest freshman class in the school's 115-year history.

Louisiana College in Pineville formally announced its new name Louisiana Christian University on November 16, 2021, during a meeting of the Louisiana Baptist Convention, according to a Wednesday news release.

Campus
Louisiana Christian University is situated on an  campus in Pineville. The school has twenty-five academic and residential buildings, which include:

 Alexandria Hall, constructed in 1920, houses most of the LCU administrative offices, and the departments of history, business, human behavior, teacher education, English, and foreign languages. Within Alexandria Hall is the Ruth O'Quinn Center for Liberal Arts and Professional Studies. Designed to upgrade technology resources, the center is named for Ruth Margaret Granger O'Quinn (1925-2021), a 1960 LC alumnus, retired classroom teacher, and a former member of the Rapides Parish School Board. She was the widow of Hansel B. O'Quinn (1916-1967; LC Class of 1954). In 2013, O'Quinn was named an LC "Distinguished Alumnus."  
 Cavanaugh Hall of Science, built in 1969, contains offices, classrooms and laboratory facilities for the departments of biology, chemistry, mathematics, and nursing. The building was named in 1975 to honor Charles J. Cavanaugh, an LC professor of biology from 1945 to 1977.
 Weathersby Fine Arts Building, completed in 1961 and completely renovated in 1993, contains the departments of art and music. The building features an exhibition gallery with adjacent storeroom and a 151-seat recital hall.
 Guinn Auditorium and Religious Education Center, built in 1973 in an earlier capital improvements program, is home to the religious studies department and contains the 300-seat Frances Bolton Chapel and the 1,800-seat Guinn Auditorium. The auditorium is home to the Gladys Tatum West pipe organ, a 185-rank, five manual Moeller organ, one of the largest such instruments in the American South. The building is named in honor of past president G. Earl Guinn.
 Martin Performing Arts Center, built in 1992, houses the media communications, journalism, and theatre departments, a 400-seat black-box theatre, a television studio, and Radio KZLC, 95.5 MHz FM.
 H. O. West Physical Education Building, which contains a 4,800-seat gymnasium, a heated swimming pool, and the department of health and physical education, is named for the late retailer H.O. West of Minden, the husband of Gladys Tatum West.
 Norton Library, which contains more than 130,000 volumes, 174,000 government documents, 75,000 items in microfilm and subscribes to over 500 periodicals. The building was built in 1955.
 Tudor Hall, a men's residence hall that has a capacity of 168 men. The building was constructed in 1957. The hall is currently undergoing renovation to all of the dormitories, which is expected to be completed by late 2020.
 English Village, a men's apartment complex open to upperclassmen, houses ninety-two students and is noted for its Lincoln Log style design.
 Church Hall, a former Methodist church, renovated into a men's residence hall, is open to upperclassmen and also houses the football fieldhouse and the security and information technology offices.
 Cottingham Hall, a women's residence hall, is named in honor of Claybrook Cottingham, a native of Virginia, who was the LC president from 1910 until 1941, when he became the president of Louisiana Tech University in Ruston. Built in 1940, Cottingham Hall houses three hundred women. It is the largest residential building on the campus.
 College Drive Apartments, the newest building on the Louisiana College campus, being completed in 2001. This apartment building is open to upperclass women and can house forty-five.
 Hixson Student Center and Granberry Conference Center, remodeled in 1997, is the hub of student activities. It houses the post office, a commons area, a game room, various student life offices, a short-order restaurant, and the campus bookstore.

Academics

Louisiana Christian University awards the Bachelor of Arts, Bachelor of Music, Bachelor of Science, Bachelor of Science in Nursing, Bachelor of Social Work, and Bachelor of General Studies degrees and offers more than seventy majors, minors and pre-professional programs. The academic divisions and departments include:

 Division of Business
 School of Missions And Ministries
 Division of Christian Studies
 School of Education
 Division of History and Political Science
 School of Human Behavior
 Division of Language & Literature
 Division of Natural Science and Math
 Department of Biology
 Department of Chemistry
 Department of Mathematics and Computer Science
 School of Nursing & Allied Health
 Division of Visual and Performing Arts
 Division of Fine Arts
 Department of Media, Communication, & Theatre
 Department of Music

LGBT purity
Louisiana College withdrew from the Council of Christian Colleges and Universities (CCCU) in 2019 because CCCU supported civil rights protections for LGBT students. The college states that one should "seek to live in purity before the Lord" by rejecting feelings of same-sex attraction.

LCU maintains a close relationship with Alliance Defending Freedom, a designated hate group by the Southern Poverty Law Center, which has referred to same sex marriage as a public health crisis and advocates for the sterilization of transgender individuals. During the 2021-2022 school year, LCU held multiple events featuring ADF Regional Director Shannon Kendrick, as well as senior counsel Gregory S. Baylor. The events were held as part of the university's "Christ Church Culture" series, which are mandatory attendance for students receiving various scholarships provided by the school, comprising over half of the student body population.

Views on Creationism and Evolution
Louisiana Christian University supports the teaching of Intelligent Design, a pseudo-scientific theory on the origin of life. In Alexandria Hall, the famous Sebastian C. Adams' Synchronological Chart of Universal History (1881) charts the biblical history narrative as it intersects with contemporary history. Notably, this chart covers a 6,000-year period, which is compatible with young-earth creationist views on biblical history. Dr. Wade Warren, who holds the Cavanaugh Chair in Biology, has endorsed the inclusion of language in educational standards that cast doubt on the validity of Darwin's theory of evolution. Moreover, Dr. Warren has publicly argued that "the evidence today is suggesting that the Darwinian model is failing and that life itself was intentionally designed." In late 2019, Ken Ham, the founder of Answers in Genesis was scheduled to speak at the annual Values and Ethics Conference. Ultimately, Ham was unable to visit due to personal reasons.

Law school in Shreveport
In May 2022, Guidepost Solutions released an independent report stating that the law school's namesake is the defendant in a civil lawsuit alleging that he repeatedly abused the plaintiff beginning when the plaintiff was 14. Two other men have submitted affidavits accusing Pressler of sexual misconduct.

Dispute over divinity school
On December 14, 2010, the LC trustees received a $1 million contribution from an anonymous foundation to launch a divinity school on the Pineville campus. The school was named the Caskey School of Divinity, after a Southern Baptist minister who "tirelessly worked and evangelized in Louisiana". The founding dean for the school was Dr. Charles Quarles. Louisiana College was able to grant up to the master's degree under Level 3 status of the Southern Association of Colleges and Schools (SACS). The school began classes in Fall 2011. The school planned to initially accept up to one hundred students with free tuition, something unprecedented. Dr. Quarles explained the goals of the Caskey School of Divinity:

Meanwhile, funding of the divinity school came into question. The Cason Foundation, which donated $5 million to LC to fund the divinity school, announced that it will no longer financially support the college because of "actions of President (Joe) Aguillard which we believe to be unethical and potentially illegal." Edgar Cason and his wife, Flora Jean Caskey Cason, who established the foundation in honor of her father, informed LC trustees by letter on April 15 that it would end its ties to LC. A probe into the matter by a law firm in New Orleans claims that Aguillard had improperly diverted some $60,000 in divinity school donations to LC projects in Tanzania, Africa. Five LC board members, however, have defended Aguillard and maintain that he did not act improperly regarding the funds. Cason further questioned why the LC trustees did not permit him to address the board at its March meeting.

A special committee of the trustees voted 4–3 to clear Aguillard of wrongdoing in regard to the diverted funds. One of the dissenting votes was cast by Tony Perkins, a former member of the Louisiana House of Representatives and the president of the Family Research Council. Perkins subsequently questioned in an email to the Reverend Kris Chenier, chairman of the special panel and the pastor of the Trinity Heights Baptist Church in Shreveport, why the committee had implied that the vote to clear Aguillard had been unanimous, rather than by the one-vote margin. On April 30, the trustees called a special meeting to consider the dispute over the divinity school. Trustees voted for the time being to retain Aguillard as president and laid spiritual hands over him. It was not disclosed how many of the thirty-four trustees were present for the special meeting or the breakdown of the vote, but the trustees declared the matter closed for further consideration.

Student life
One of the things which sets LCU apart from other schools is its commitment to promoting a Christian atmosphere. Because LCU is a small school it fosters a small community environment where most students are familiar with each other. Overall development amongst the student body is new and growing as the college grows larger and evolves. LCU is still in a state of growth and expansion and has been experiencing record setting enrollment within the past few years. In addition to promoting a Christian atmosphere, students at LCU have a strong involvement with athletic/intramural events.

Traditions at LC

Louisiana Christian University have several treasured traditions carried out by its students. While LCU lacks a large variety of student organizations, traditions are handed down mostly through word of mouth. One of the first traditions learned about at LCU is the marriage swing located in front of Cottingham Hall. Legend holds that if a couple sits on the swing at the same time they are destined to be married. This of course leads to apprehension to sit on the swing, although many take their chances. Several have even proposed at the marriage swing.  However, unknown to most LCU students, the original marriage swing was broken in the spring semester of the 2010–2011 school year and replaced by a replica. Even had this tragedy not occurred, the purported mystical effects of the marriage swing would have been rendered null in the spring of 2015 when the student government paid to have every swing on campus replaced. Another tradition held is the annual rolling of Cottingham Forest during Mom's Weekend. Every year LCU holds a Mom's Weekend event when girls and their moms share time together on campus. On the first night of this weekend the male students of LCU collect toilet paper and use it to TP the trees immediately in front of Cottingham Hall. In the morning the girls awake to a white wintery wonderland.  It is widely rumored that current LCU president Rick Brewer disapproves of this much-beloved tradition. Another tradition is the fabled Moses statue in front of the Weathersby Fine Arts Building. Legend says that it holds the power of good luck. Individuals receive this power by rubbing the top of the statue's head. This phenomenon has been investigated by many, but few are able to offer sufficient explanations for it. The echo spot is the name given to a place near Alexandria Hall that acts like a natural megaphone for voices, jokes, music, etc. Many students gather around it and shout "echo" or other phrases, then giggle at the strange effect. Throughout the school year Louisiana Christian University holds several annual events. Homecoming Honey is an event held during homecoming week; male students compete for the hotly contested title of "homecoming honey" by showing off their talents and personalities. The winner is then selected by a panel of judges. Christmas Gala is a treasured tradition at Louisiana Christian University. This is LCU's equivalent of prom without a dance. Students bring a date to a formal dinner and enjoy well prepared meals. After the meal students file into an auditorium for a Christmas presentation put on by professors and students. During this presentation the Gala Court is announced and presented to the student body.  Cochon De Lait is another event put on by LCU's Union Board. Cochon is a campus-wide crawfish boil with all you can eat crawfish. This event is much anticipated and students' families often participate. There are often inflatable games and live music.

Athletics

The Louisiana Christian athletic teams are called the Wildcats and Lady Wildcats. The university is a member of the National Association of Intercollegiate Athletics (NAIA), primarily competing in the Red River Athletic Conference (RRAC) for most of its sports since the 2021–22 academic year; while its football team competes in the Sooner Athletic Conference (SAC). The Wildcats and Lady Wildcats previously competed in the American Southwest Conference (ASC) of the Division III ranks of the National Collegiate Athletic Association (NCAA) from 2000–01 to 2020–21; and in the NAIA's Gulf Coast Athletic Conference (GCAC) from 1981–82 to 1999–2000.

Louisiana Christian competes in nine intercollegiate varsity sports: Men's sports include baseball, basketball, football, golf and soccer; while women's sports include basketball, soccer, softball and volleyball. Former sports included men's and women's cross country, women's golf, men's and women's tennis, and men's and women's track & field.

Notable people

Faculty
 Charles J. Cavanaugh, Professor of Biology, taught for 32 years and retired in 1977. Built a strong pre-med program.

Alumni

Politics
 Chris Broadwater, District 86 state representative from Tangipahoa Parish (January 2012-December 2017)
 Jackson B. Davis (1918–2016), former state senator; attended LC from 1933 to 1934 
 Jimmie Davis (1899–2000), popular singer and 47th Governor of Louisiana (1944–1948 and 1960–1964). The former governor has a tuition-free scholarship in his name for incoming freshman, along with a historic marker located near Alexandria Hall. Member of the Country Music Hall of Fame
 C. H. "Sammy" Downs (Class of 1932, 1911–1985), member of both houses of the Louisiana state legislature from Rapides Parish and advisor to Governors Earl Kemp Long and John McKeithen
 Rufus D. Hayes (1913–2002), first Louisiana insurance commissioner, 1957–1964
 Edith Killgore Kirkpatrick (born 1918), member of Louisiana Board of Regents; state Baptist official; wife of Claude Kirkpatrick
 Richard Land (born 1946), member of Board of Reference for establishment of Judge Paul Pressler School of Law in Shreveport
 George S. Long (1883–1958), U.S. representative from the defunct Eighth Congressional District
 Lance Harris (born 1961), Republican majority leader of the Louisiana House of Representatives for Rapides Parish since 2012; attended LC, dates unavailable

Media
 Winston De Ville (born 1937), Louisiana genealogist and publisher.
 Baylus Benjamin McKinney (1886–1952), singer, songwriter, and music editor; composed "The Nail Scarred Hand", "I Am Satisfied with Jesus", and "Wherever He Leads I'll Go".
 Tinka Milinović, Bosnian-American recording artist.

Sports
 Jeremy Vujnovich (Born 1990), former NFL offensive lineman
 Ben McLaughlin (Born 1986), former LCU quarterback. 2010 Melberger Award winner; 2010 Gagliardi Trophy finalist; 2010 All-LSWA Offensive Player of the Year
 Ernie Duplechin (1932-2020) former football and baseball player at LCU from 1952 to 1955. Former head football coach and athletic director at McNeese State University in Lake Charles, Louisiana. 
 Jesse Hickman (1939-2022), former professional baseball player with the Kansas City Athletics of the MLB
 John T. Curtis, Jr. (Born 1947), head football coach and headmaster at John Curtis Christian School in River Ridge, Louisiana. Winningest high school football coach in Louisiana history and second winningest high school coach all-time nationally

Education
 G. Earl Guinn (1912–2004), first LC graduate to be president of the college (1951–1975)
 Garnie W. McGinty (1900–1984), Louisiana historian began his studies at LC but graduated from Northwestern State University in Natchitoches

Religion
 Wilmer Clemont Fields (1922–2018) (BA), Southern Baptist minister and SBC executive.

References

External links
 
 Official athletics website

 
Liberal arts colleges in Louisiana
Universities and colleges affiliated with the Southern Baptist Convention
Universities and colleges accredited by the Southern Association of Colleges and Schools
Baptist organizations established in the 20th century
Educational institutions established in 1906
Pineville, Louisiana
Buildings and structures in Rapides Parish, Louisiana
1906 establishments in Louisiana
Council for Christian Colleges and Universities
Private universities and colleges in Louisiana